Alchemy is a burn event operated according to the 10 Principles of Burning Man held annually in the early fall. Alchemy was first held in 2007 and grew quickly to become the largest regional burn in the United States and second largest in the world in 2012. In 2013, the event cap was lowered by approximately 1,000. However the 2014 cap was set at 3,200 participants as was the 2015 cap.

Until 2016, Alchemy was held at Cherokee Farms, a private campground in La Fayette, Georgia, approximately 100 miles northwest of Atlanta. Alchemy 2016 took place in Bowdon, Georgia at Little Big Jam. That year's ticket cap was 2,700.

Alchemy and its sister event Euphoria are now managed by the Georgia non-profit Flashpoint Artists Initiative.

With the exception of a few contracted services, Alchemy and Flashpoint Artists Initiative are 100% volunteer managed.

Event Management

Each year's event is managed by a team of 3-5 individuals, designated as the Events Committee, chosen by the Flashpoint Artists Initiative (FAI) Board of Directors. A public call out is made by the Board and is distributed via FAI's newsletter, The Alchemist, along with all of their social media outlets. Soon after their selection, the EC submits an event budget proposal to the Board for approval. This proposal typically contains an overall operations budget for the event, ticket price, ticket cap, event dates, and event location.

The EC has four departments: Operations, Safety, Information, and Art. Each department is managed by a Department Lead and sometimes an Assistant Department Lead. The entire EC is overseen by 1-2 Event Leads and Assistant Event Leads that act as project managers for the entire event.

The EC, utilizing the same communications outlets, then makes public call outs for the individual teams that manage the day-to-day operations of the event teams. The team leads are chosen by the EC, and there are typically 2-5 people chosen to lead each team.

None of Alchemy's EC and Team Leads are paid for their services and operate on a 100% volunteer basis. From time to time, they may be compensated with food, gas money, or other similar expenses.

Alchemy Public Works (APW)

APW is responsible for deploying and maintaining event infrastructure such as generators, tools, and shade structures. In conjunction with Fire Safety and EMS, they are also responsible for preparing the effigy to be burned on the Saturday night of the event. They also work with the EC and the Board on acquiring new equipment and infrastructure.

Art

The Art Team works with the Alchemy Art Fundraiser Event Leads to facilitate artists being able to bring and place their art installations at the event. They are the point-of-contact between Alchemy funded artists and the Placement Team, the Fire Safety Team (for art that is to be burned or utilizes open flames), and documenting art at the event.

Center Camp

Center Camp is housed under a large circus tent and is intended to be a stage for any and all participants at the event to showcase their art and expression. The Center Camp Leads are responsible for facilitating participants scheduling their own performances, coordinating with artists on showcasing their art, procuring furniture for participants to use throughout the event, as well as setting up and maintaining the camp's sound system.

Connexus

Connexus is the main information clearinghouse at the event itself. Connexus is the place to go if you want information about the land, locations of various camps and activities, teams and volunteer opportunities, theme camp locations and registration, and lost and found.

Department of Mutant Vehicles (DMV)

The DMV is responsible for ensuring the registration and safe operation of mobile works of creative expression otherwise known as mutant vehicles, as well as ensuring only mutant vehicles are operating on Alchemy streets. Additionally, the DMV is responsible for ensuring all cars are parked in the designated parking areas only.

Effigy Team

The Effigy Team is responsible for designing and building the event's effigy, a large wooden art piece that is burned on the Saturday night of the event.

Fire Safety

The Fire Safety team is responsible for maintaining safety at large scale burns and fire-related installations. This team coordinates with artists and emergency service personnel to determine appropriate safety parameters for anything regarding fire. The team is responsible for developing emergency response procedures in conjunction with the Event Lead Team. This team develops  a fire safety plan and communicates  that plan to local authorities and ensures compliance with all local, state and federal laws.

First Aid

First Aid is responsible for procuring and maintaining basic first aid materials. Participants may request the use of these materials should they decide they require them. The First Aid team also works with the paid, licensed, and insured Emergency Medical Technicians.

The First Aid team was eliminated in 2016. All medical services are provided by a contracted group of licensed and insured medical professionals.

Education Team)

Education organizes the volunteers who provide a greeting function to new arrivals at the event. Greeters are usually the second set of individuals encountered by new arrivals after the Gate workers. As such, Greeters can be helpful in building the burn "bubble" for newly arriving participants. Greeters are also responsible for the education and acculturation of all participants as they enter the event.

Lamplighters

The Lamplighters Team lights the city’s streets, and maintains the lamps. Each night before sunrise, the Lamplighters place lamps on lamp poles, which were set into the ground prior to the event. Lamplighters are a prestigious group with deep and mysterious rituals.

Leave No Trace (LNT)

The LNT team is responsible for continuing education about the Leave No Trace philosophy and techniques. The Team helps Alchemy participants identify ways to keep their own camps clean and is also the lead organizer for post-festival site recovery.

Placement

The Placement and Theme Camp team plans and maps out the city. Participants apply, and the team places theme camps, villages, and hamlets in requested areas whenever possible and feasible.

Rangers

Rangers are primarily concerned with safety issues, maintaining the community’s standards, and helping people resolve conflicts. They help participants solve their own problems using non-confrontational mediation. Rangers do not have any special authority; what they do have is specific training and resources that enable them to deal with situations and scenarios beyond the scope of a non-Ranger participant. They are Rangers because they’re  who volunteered to take the training, wear the T-shirt and be available to help their community. Rangers know it is not about them, it’s about their fellow participant and community.

Tear Down

The Tear Down Team is responsible for ensuring that all FAI-owned tools, equipment, and infrastructure are taken down and properly stored in the Alchemy storage container. Alchemy Public Works used to perform this function, but a separate team was created when the job became too much for just one team.

Temple

The Temple team is responsible for designing and constructing the Alchemy temple. The temples tend to be smaller than the effigies. The Temple team strives to create a structure and atmosphere that facilitates reflection and contemplation. Participants will often leave written messages, trinkets, or other items important to their past on the temple for them to be burned. Unlike the Burning Man and other regional burn event temples, Alchemy's temple is burned at sunrise on Sunday morning.

Volunteers

The Volunteer Team helps organize all the team volunteers that help Alchemy operate on a day-to-day basis. The team helps find people to fill teams, as well as assists in finding volunteer opportunities for people who want to help but aren't exactly sure how. All volunteers are funneled through the Volunteer Team. The Volunteer Team also manages the Alchemy website's volunteer signup and management system.

Paid Services

While Event Leads, Team Leads, and team volunteers are not paid, the EC does contract out specific services:

Portable Potties 
Radios 
Golf Carts 
Wood Delivery 
Gate Staff 
Security Team 
Heavy equipment rental 
Pyrotechnics
Emergency medical services

These services require licensed, insured professionals or have significant equipment and infrastructure requirements that would otherwise be over-burdensome for FAI or the EC to procure. For example, the pyrotechnics utilized for the effigy burn require licensed professionals to set up both for safety purposes and to ensure compliance with local and state laws.

Art Funding and the Alchemy Art Fundraiser

Funding for art installations by Alchemy does not follow the traditional art grant model. Instead, a separate fundraising event is held, and the event is managed by an Event Lead Team chosen by the FAI Board. Artists desiring funding bring proposals and displays for their ideas to the event. Once attendees pay the door fee, they are given a ballot with a list of all projects at the event. Attendees allocate the entirety of the door fee, in whole dollar amounts, to each project as they see fit. At the end of the night, the ballots are counted and the total amount of money for each project is allocated for their respective artist.

Other sources of funding include refreshment sales and a silent auction of community-donated art. The funds collected from these sources are allocated on a percentage basis according to the ballot distribution. In 2012, the Alchemy EC decided to allocate $10,000 for fund matching. This pool of $10,000 was also distributed on a percentage basis like refreshment and silent auction sales. In 2013, that amount was increased to $15,000.

References

External links

Euphoria - Alchemy's sister project

Burning Man